Labesvara Siva Temple (Hanumantesvara) is a Hindu temple situated near Bhubaneswar, Odisha, India. The sandstone temple shows signs of deterioration, including cracks in the roof through which rain water percolates into the sanctum.

See also
 List of temples in Bhubaneswar
 List of Hindu temples in India: Orissa

Reference notes

Lesser Known Monuments of Bhubaneswar by Dr. Sadasiba Pradhan.
https://web.archive.org/web/20121009190909/http://ignca.nic.in/asi_reports/

Hindu temples in Bhubaneswar